Střítež may refer to places in the Czech Republic:

Střítež (Český Krumlov District), a municipality and village in the South Bohemian Region
Střítež (Frýdek-Místek District), a municipality and village in the Moravian-Silesian Region
Střítež (Jihlava District), a municipality and village in the Vysočina Region
Střítež (Pelhřimov District), a municipality and village in the Vysočina Region
Střítež (Třebíč District), a municipality and village in the Vysočina Region
Střítež (Žďár nad Sázavou District), a municipality and village in the Vysočina Region
Střítež, a village and part of Černovice (Pelhřimov District) in the South Bohemian Region
Střítež, a village and part of Dolní Kralovice in the Central Bohemian Region
Střítež, a village and part of Hluboká (Chrudim District) in the Pardubice Region
Střítež, a village and part of Kolinec in the Plzeň Region
Střítež, a village and part of Litochovice in the South Bohemian Region
Střítež, a village and part of Polička in the Pardubice Region
Střítež, a village and part of Trutnov in the Hradec Králové Region
Střítež, a village and part of Včelákov in the Pardubice Region
Střítež, a village and part of Vlksice in the South Bohemian Region
Střítež nad Bečvou, a municipality and village in the Zlín Region
Střítež nad Ludinou, a municipality and village in the Olomouc Region
Střítež pod Křemešníkem, a municipality and village in the Vysočina Region
Zadní Střítež, a municipality and village in the South Bohemian Region